Zina Garrison was the defending champion but lost in the semifinals to Martina Navratilova.

Navratilova won in the final 6–1, 6–2 against Larisa Savchenko.

Seeds
A champion seed is indicated in bold text while text in italics indicates the round in which that seed was eliminated.

  Martina Navratilova (champion)
  Gabriela Sabatini (semifinals)
  Hana Mandlíková (quarterfinals)
  Zina Garrison (semifinals)
  Sylvia Hanika (second round)
  Natasha Zvereva (quarterfinals)
  Mary Joe Fernández (second round)
  Catarina Lindqvist (second round)

Draw

External links
 1988 Virginia Slims of California draw

Silicon Valley Classic
1988 WTA Tour